The 1994 Virginia Slims Championships were played on indoor carpet courts at the Madison Square Garden in New York City, United States between November 14 and November 20. It marked the last singles tournament for Czech player Martina Navratilova until her comeback in 2002. The singles title was won by unseeded Gabriela Sabatini and earned $250,000 first-prize money. This was the final year with Virginia Slims as the title sponsor of the season-ending championships.

Finals

Singles

 Gabriela Sabatini defeated  Lindsay Davenport, 6–3, 6–2, 6–4
 It was Sabatini's only singles title of the year and the 26th of her career.

Singles

 Gigi Fernández /  Natasha Zvereva defeated  Jana Novotná /  Arantxa Sánchez Vicario, 6–3, 6–7(4–7), 6–3

External links
 
 ITF tournament edition details
 Tournament draws

WTA Tour Championships
WTA Tour Championships
WTA Tour Championships
WTA Tour Championships
1990s in Manhattan
WTA Tour Championships
Madison Square Garden
Sports competitions in New York City
Sports in Manhattan
Tennis tournaments in New York City